Tuaopepe Asiata Jerry Wallwork (born 29 August 1972) is a Samoan weightlifter. He competed in the men's heavyweight I event at the 1992 Summer Olympics. 

Tuaopepe is the son of weightlifter Paul Wallwork and the brother of Attorney-General Su'a Hellene Wallwork. in June 2017 he was appointed to the board of the International Weightlifting Federation.

In December 2022 the Samoa Observer named Tuaopepe one of its people of the year.

References

1972 births
Living people
Samoan male weightlifters
Olympic weightlifters of Samoa
Weightlifters at the 1992 Summer Olympics
Place of birth missing (living people)